"This Ain't No Love Song" is a song written by Tony Lane, Marcel Chagnon and David Lee, and recorded by American country music artist Trace Adkins.  It was released in May 2010 as the second single from his album Cowboy's Back in Town.

Critical reception
Bobby Peacock of Roughstock gave the song 3.5 out of 5 stars, describing the song as "a neat little inversion and a perfect fit for his voice." He also said that Adkins "seems to overdose on the masculine swagger, he tones it down just enough without sacrificing his slightly defiant, strong nature." Peacock also said that the song should get Adkins back on track as a country artist for good.  Kevin John Coyne of Country Universe gave the song a B grade saying that the Adkins sings the song well but he "doesn't sing it well enough to elevate it beyond what it already is".

Music video
The music video was directed by Michael Salomon starring Adkins and Playboy Playmate Jaime Faith Edmondson and premiered on the CMT website on June 18, 2010.

Chart performance
"This Ain't No Love Song" debuted at number 54 on the U.S. Billboard Hot Country Songs charts for the week of May 22, 2010.

References

2010 singles
2010 songs
Trace Adkins songs
Music videos directed by Michael Salomon
Show Dog-Universal Music singles
Songs written by Tony Lane (songwriter)
Songs written by Marcel (singer)
Song recordings produced by Michael Knox (record producer)
Songs written by David Lee (songwriter)